The Edinburgh Gazette is a newspaper of record (government gazette) of the Government of the United Kingdom, along with The London Gazette and The Belfast Gazette. It is published by The Stationery Office (TSO), on behalf of His Majesty's Stationery Office (HMSO) in Edinburgh, Scotland. The Crown Agent is, ex officio, the Keeper of the Edinburgh Gazette.

History 
Publication of The Edinburgh Gazette began on 2 March 1699 by James Watson, nearly 34 years after the first edition of The London Gazette in November 1665. Watson printed 41 issues, the last on 17 July 1699. Captain Donaldson, the editor, said afterwards that Watson "found it in his interest to disengage himself", perhaps alluding to his imprisonment in the preceding June for printing false news on the wool export and reporting the riotous behaviour of some textile workers in The Edinburgh Gazette. The publication was then transferred to John Reid.

It reappeared sporadically, but did not begin an unbroken and continuous publication run until 1793.

Publication 
The Edinburgh Gazette is published on Tuesdays and Fridays, and it includes official notices relating to matters of state, Parliament, planning, transport, and public finance, as well as insolvency and bankruptcy notices. It also contains advertisements. For instance, local authorities place notices in the Gazette about matters of local interest, such as road closures.

References

External links
 The Edinburgh Gazette - Official website
 TSO (The Stationery Office)

1699 establishments in Scotland
Newspapers published in Scotland
Government gazettes
17th century in Scotland
Publications established in the 1690s